Hemiancistrus megalopteryx is a species of catfish in the family Loricariidae. It is native to South America, where it occurs in the Tubarão River basin in the state of Santa Catarina in Brazil. The species reaches 28.6 cm (11.3 inches) SL.

References 

Ancistrini
Fish described in 2004